Kamberović is a surname. Notable people with the surname include:

 Faik Kamberović (born 1967), Bosnian footballer
 Husnija Kamberović (born 1963), Bosnian historian
 Radenko Kamberović (born 1983), Serbian footballer

Bosnian surnames